Koralliomyia is a genus of parasitic flies in the family Tachinidae.

Species
Koralliomyia portentosa Mesnil, 1950

Distribution
India, Australia

References

Diptera of Asia
Diptera of Australasia
Exoristinae
Insects of India
Tachinidae genera
Monotypic Brachycera genera